Marcelo Guioto or simply Marcelo Batatais (born September 9, 1974 in Batatais, São Paulo), is a former Brazilian centre defender. Batatais was known for his incredible heading ability.

Marcelo Guioto previously played for Cruzeiro and Vitória in the Campeonato Brasileiro.

Titles

Cruzeiro
 Brazilian League: 2003
 Brazilian Cup: 2003
 Minas Gerais State Championship: 2002, 2003, 2004

See also
Football in Brazil
List of football clubs in Brazil

References

1974 births
Living people
Brazilian footballers
Associação Desportiva São Caetano players
Association football defenders
Batatais Futebol Clube players
People from Batatais